Zitella is a genus of beetles in the family Buprestidae, containing the following species:

 Zitella denticulata (Thery, 1954)
 Zitella gestroi (Thery, 1954)
 Zitella obenbergeri (Thery, 1954)
 Zitella strandi (Obenberger, 1928)

References

Buprestidae genera